Gijuiyeh may refer to:
 Gijuiyeh, Arzuiyeh (گيجوييه)
 Gijuiyeh, Baft (گيجوئيه)